Gladiolus palustris, common name marsh gladiolus or sword lily, is a herbaceous perennial plant belonging to the genus Gladiolus of the family Iridaceae. The genus name Gladiolus is the Latin diminutive of gladius, a sword, while the specific Latin name palustris, meaning growing in marshes, refers to the alleged environment of this species.

Description
Gladiolus palustris reaches on average  of height. The stem is erect, glabrous and unbranched, the bulbus is spherical with cross-linked fibers at the top. The flowering period of these plants extends from May through July. They are pollinated by bumblebees.

Gallery

Distribution
This species is native of Central and NW Europe. It occurs in eastern France, Switzerland,  in southern and eastern Germany, the Czech Republic, Slovakia and Poland. It is present in the Italian Alps, Austria and Hungary and more common in the Balkan region. Other locations are in Eastern Europe, including Romania.

Habitat
Notwithstanding the name, these plants do not grow in marshes, as they prefer calcareous, moist and humus rich environments alternately wet and dry, in wet meadows and forest clearings.

References

 Pignatti S. - Flora d'Italia - Edagricole – 1982

External links
 Biolib
 Rare Plants

palustris
Flora of Austria
Flora of the Czech Republic
Flora of Germany
Flora of Hungary
Flora of Italy
Flora of Poland
Flora of Slovakia
Flora of Switzerland